Swami Stree (English: Husband and Wife) is a 1987 Bangladeshi film starring Razzak, Shabana, Alamgir and Parvin Sultana Diti in lead roles. The latter earned Bangladesh National Film Award for Best Supporting Actress that year. Subhash Dutta directed the film.

Songs
"Jedike Tumi Dekhbe Chokhe" - Sabina Yasmin and Syed Abdul Hadi
"Je Sukher Nei Kono Simana" - Sabina Yasmin

Awards
Bangladesh National Film Awards
Best Supporting Actress - Parvin Sultana Diti

References

External links
 

1987 films
Films scored by Alauddin Ali
Bengali-language Bangladeshi films
1980s Bengali-language films